DXBT (99.5 FM), broadcasting as Monster BT 99.5, is a radio station owned and operated by Audiovisual Communicators, Inc. Its studio and transmitter are located at The Peak, Gaisano Mall of Davao, J.P. Laurel Ave., Bajada, Davao City. This station airs from 6:00 AM to 8:00 PM daily.

The station was formerly known as OZ 99.5 under Amapola Broadcasting from its inception in 1995 to 2002, when Audiovisual Communicators acquired the station and became part of the Monster Radio network.

References

Radio stations in Davao City
Contemporary hit radio stations in the Philippines
Radio stations established in 1995